Soyuz TM-5 was a crewed Soyuz spaceflight to Mir. It was launched on June 7, 1988, carrying the Mir EP-2 mission's three-person crew. This week-long stay on Mir occurred during the third long-duration Mir expedition, Mir EO-3. The crew of EP-2 returned to Earth aboard Soyuz TM-4, while the TM-5 spacecraft remained docked to Mir, acting as the lifeboat for the long-duration crew. On September 7, 1988, the TM-5 spacecraft undocked from Mir, and landed Mir EP-3 mission's two-person visiting crew. The de-orbit procedures for Soyuz were revised after this flight, as multiple issues almost prevented the descent module's safe de-orbit and landing.

Crew

Launch

Soyuz TM-5 launched on 1988 June 7 and arrived at Mir on June 9 carrying the second Bulgarian in space, Alexandrov (not to be confused with the Soviet cosmonaut of the same name). He became the first Bulgarian to reach a Soviet space station (Georgi Ivanov failed to reach Salyut 6 on Soyuz 33 in 1979—Alexandrov was his backup). Their launch had been advanced by 2 weeks late in the planning stages to improve lighting conditions for the Rozhen astronomical experiment.

Landing

On September 5 cosmonauts Lyakhov and Mohmand undocked from Mir. They jettisoned the orbital module and made ready for deorbit burn to return to Earth. During descent, the spacecraft experienced a computer software problem combined with a sensor problem. This caused their landing to be delayed by a full day. The Descent Module, where they spent this 24-hour period, had no sanitary facilities. Consequently, they soiled themselves.  They would not have been able to redock with Mir because they had discarded the docking system along with the orbital module. Reentry occurred as normal on September 7. Following this incident, the Soviets decided that on future missions, they would retain the orbital module until after deorbit burn, as they had done on the Soyuz Ferry flights.

References

Crewed Soyuz missions
Spacecraft launched in 1988
1988 in the Soviet Union
Bulgaria–Soviet Union relations